Torba (or TorBa) is the northernmost and least populous province of Vanuatu. It consists of the Banks Islands and the Torres Islands.

The province's name is derived from the initial letters of "TORres" and "BAnks".

Population

The province has a population of 9,359 
Its capital is Sola on Vanua Lava.

Islands
These are the main islands of Torba Province, excluding smaller and uninhabited islets.

Banks Islands

Torres Islands

Languages

The Torba province has seventeen languages, all Oceanic — from north to south: Hiw, Lo-Toga, Lehali, Löyöp, Volow, Mwotlap, Lemerig, Vera'a, Vurës, Mwesen, Mota, Nume, Dorig, Koro, Olrat, Lakon, Mwerlap.

With 550 speakers per language on average (17 for 9,300 people), Torba is one of the linguistically densest areas of Vanuatu – itself the country with the highest density of languages per capita in the world.

References

Bibliography

 .

 
Provinces of Vanuatu
States and territories established in 1994